Hans Mehren (born 24 January 1945) is a Norwegian sailor. He competed in the Flying Dutchman event at the 1964 Summer Olympics.

References

External links
 

1945 births
Living people
Norwegian male sailors (sport)
Olympic sailors of Norway
Sailors at the 1964 Summer Olympics – Flying Dutchman
Sportspeople from Oslo